Route 256 is a collector road in the Canadian province of Nova Scotia.

It is located in the northern part of the province and connects West New Annan at Route 246 with Lyons Brook at Route 376.

Communities
West New Annan
The Falls
West Branch River John
River John
Scotsburn
Lyons Brook

Museums
Balmoral Grist Mill

See also
List of Nova Scotia provincial highways

References

Nova Scotia provincial highways
Roads in Colchester County
Roads in Pictou County